Mailand Upper Secondary School is an upper secondary school in Lørenskog in Viken county, Norway. Established in 2008, it is one of two public upper secondary schools in Lørenskog municipality along with Lørenskog Upper Secondary School.

History
As early as in 1999 the County Council in Akershus formally decided to build a new high school in the populous lower Romerike area. The background was an expected increase in age cohorts up to 2010. In 2002 it was decided that the new school would be located Lørenskog. Various blank solutions and the own / lease question was discussed before it was adopted in 2006 that the new high school would be built at Kjenn adjacent to the town hall. Later it was decided that the school should be named after Mailand which was a farm that was previously on the same site.

Construction began in March 2007, and the school was ready to start in the school-year of August 2008. Mailand secondary school is located in what will become Lørenskog's new municipal and cultural center, library and shops on one side of Strømsveien road and City Hall Park and Langevann lake on the other side. Thus is Mailand high school at the intersection between town and countryside and nature and culture. This Cross-section is found in some of the art at the school.

Education
The school was originally planned for 720 students. When the school started in 2008, there were 400 pupils. When school started in 2010, the number of pupils had reached 690 and the staff counted 113. The school offers the following programmes at 1st 2nd and 3rd year level: General Studies, Health and Social Care, service and communications, media and communication, and a department of special education.

External links
 Official site

References

Secondary schools in Norway
Education in Viken (county)
Lørenskog
Akershus County Municipality
Educational institutions established in 2008
2008 establishments in Norway